Leon Power (born 27 February 1986 in Sydney, Australia) is an Australian rugby union player. He plays in the lock position for Bay of Plenty and Super Rugby franchise, the Brumbies.

References

External links
itsrugby.co.uk profile

1986 births
Living people
Australian rugby union players
Rugby union locks
ACT Brumbies players
Taranaki rugby union players
Bay of Plenty rugby union players
Rugby union players from Sydney
People educated at Francis Douglas Memorial College
Oyonnax Rugby players
Expatriate rugby union players in France